The Wharf is a multi-billion dollar mixed-use development on the Southwest Waterfront in Washington, D.C. It contains the city's historic Maine Avenue Fish Market, hotels, residential buildings, restaurants, shops, parks, piers, docks and marinas, and live music venues. The first phase of The Wharf opened in October 2017 and the second and final phase was completed in October 2022. The neighborhood encompasses  of land,  of water, and contain  of retail, residential, and entertainment space along  of the Potomac River shoreline from the Francis Case Memorial Bridge to Fort McNair.

The idea of redeveloping the waterfront gained momentum with District officials in the early 2000s when the Anacostia Waterfront Corporation was created to oversee the redevelopment of the Southwest Waterfront neighborhood. The redevelopment was intended to reconnect the neglected and isolated portions of the southwest quadrant with downtown Washington, D.C., and make the area accessible and attractive to pedestrians while enhancing the existing community. Developers settled on The Wharf as the project name at the suggestion of D.C. Congresswoman Eleanor Holmes Norton, who recalled that this section of the Southwest Waterfront was known as The Wharf during the 19th and early 20th centuries.

Geography

District Pier - the District Pier extends 425 feet into the Washington Channel, making it the longest pier in the city. District Pier houses the Dockmaster Building, a 2,000 square foot building with 270-degree views of the channel and waterfront.

Transit Pier - The Transit Pier provides access to water taxi services and hosts a floating stage for live music and an ice rink.

Recreation Pier - The Recreation Pier provides public access to the water as well as kayak and stand-up paddleboard rentals.

District Square - The Wharf's pedestrian mall that hosts boutiques, shops, and restaurants.

Blair Alley - A residential entrance and fountain dedicated to the memory of Blair Phillips, a young architect who worked on The Wharf project and died in a ski accident.

History
Opened in 1805, the Municipal Fish Market is the longest continually operating fish market in the United States. For a time known as Maine Avenue Fish Market, it served as the inspiration for the redevelopment project. The fish market and other businesses on the waterfront were relatively prosperous throughout the 19th century, but by the early 20th century, the area was in decline. By 1945, the Southwest Waterfront had become a target for urban renewal, and the District of Columbia Redevelopment Act allowed the U.S. federal government to acquire a property using eminent domain. The federal government removed twenty-three thousand residents, primarily African Americans, from their homes and demolished a majority of the structures. The cleared land was redeveloped into housing complexes and federal office buildings and was used for the construction of highway I-395, which now runs between the waterfront and the National Mall.

Planning and development

In 2003, Mayor Anthony A. Williams renewed interest in revitalizing the area. He created the Anacostia Waterfront Corporation to oversee development on the waterfront. In 2006, PN Hoffman was chosen from a field of 17 companies and tasked with reimagining the waterfront. PN Hoffman originally partnered with Struever Bros. Eccles & Rouse of Baltimore on the project, but the company dismantled as a result of the 2008 financial crisis. By 2008, Hoffman had acquired most of the land required for the development of The Wharf. The Council of the District of Columbia had allocated $198 million in tax increment financing bonds for infrastructure improvements to support the project. In 2010, Hoffman partnered with Madison Marquette and formed Hoffman-Madison Waterfront to bring the project to fruition. U.S. Rep. Eleanor Holmes Norton introduced two bills in Congress that made the redevelopment of the waterfront possible. One bill solidified the District's ownership of the Southwest Waterfront. The other gave the District control of portions of the Washington Channel. In honor of the congresswoman's contributions, Hoffman-Madison Waterfront named the largest park in The Wharf development after Norton.
  
Hoffman-Madison Waterfront hired the architectural firm Perkins Eastman to serve as The Wharf's master architects. By March 2013, the D.C. Zoning Commission had approved plans for phases 1 and 2 of the project. Groundbreaking for phase 1 occurred May 19, 2014, and The Wharf opened to the public October 12, 2017.

Hoffman-Madison Waterfront broke ground on the second phase of the project in March 2019. Phase 2 is expected to cost $1.25 billion, bringing the total cost of redevelopment to $3.6 billion. The second phase, completed in October 2022, added three office buildings, an apartment building, a hotel, a 96-unit condominium building, additional retail space, and two new underground parking garages. The project created 2,800 construction jobs and at completion, has added 3,000 permanent jobs.

Residential buildings
The Wharf is currently home to four apartment buildings and three condominium buildings.

Amaris – This building contains 96 condominiums, with floorplans from one to four bedrooms.

The Banks – Apartment community with rooftop terraces.

The Channel – This 12-story apartment building is built on top of The Anthem music venue. The Channel contains 501 residential units, with 153 designated as affordable and workforce housing.

Incanto – This building contains 148 residential apartments, with 47 designated as affordable and workforce housing.

The Tides – This 12-story apartment residence features 255 units ranging from studios to two-bedroom apartments.

VIO – This 12-story building along the Washington Channel contains 112 condominium residences.

525 Water – This five-story condominium contains 107 units and is situated at the eastern end of the development.

Office buildings
1000 Maine – This 250,000 square foot office building is located on the northwest end of the property. It features Jefferson Memorial, Lincoln Memorial, and Washington Monument views.

800 Maine – This 233,000 square foot, 11-story office building is situated at the corner of 9th Street and Maine Avenue SW. It is LEED Gold Core certified and features views of the U.S. Capitol.

Pier 4 – This 28,000 SF building is the only over-water office building in Washington, DC. It extends 260 feet into the Washington Channel and features multiple private outdoor terraces.

Hotels
InterContinental Washington D.C. – The Wharf – This 278-room luxury hotel overlooks District Pier and the Washington Channel. It features views of many of DC's monuments.

Hyatt House Washington DC / The Wharf – This 237-room extended-stay hotel offers suites with kitchenettes.

Canopy by Hilton - This 175-room hotel overlooks 7th Street Park and Recreation Pier.

Entertainment and activities

The Wharf features multiple live music venues, including The Anthem, a 6,000-seat concert hall, as well as the club venues Union Stage and Pearl Street Warehouse. The waterfront also features year-round street performers and musical acts that perform on a floating barge stage.
The Wharf is home to the Capital Yacht Club and some day-docks and live-aboard slips. Water taxi service connects The Wharf to Georgetown, Alexandria, Virginia, and the National Harbor in Oxon Hill, MD. Visitors may also take guided boat tours to view Washington attractions and monuments from the Potomac River. The Wharf operates a free jitney service that shuttles passengers from the Recreation Pier across the Washington Channel to East Potomac Park. Kayak and stand-up paddleboard rentals are also available seasonally.

A wood-burning fire pit is located along the waterfront at District Square. A retrofitted camper known as Camp Wharf offers supplies for s’mores, including marshmallows, chocolate, graham crackers, and sticks for roasting.

The Wharf is accessible by car, with underground parking available. A two-way cycle track runs the length of The Wharf, and the curbside is entirely reserved for rideshare and parcel pick-up and drop-off. Public transportation options include water taxis, metro, multiple Capital Bikeshare stations, and a free community shuttle. The shuttle stops at L'Enfant Plaza station on the Washington Metro, the International Spy Museum, and the National Mall adjacent to the Hirshhorn Museum and Sculpture Garden.

See also
Architecture of Washington, D.C.
Culture of Washington, D.C.

References

External links 
 

Mixed-use developments in the Baltimore-Washington metropolitan area
Southwest Waterfront
2017 establishments in Washington, D.C.